Ioan Silviu Suciu (born 24 November 1977 in Sibiu) is a retired Romanian artistic gymnast. His best event was the pommel horse. One of his closest rivals was his team mate and pommel horse Olympic champion  Marius Urzică, who was defeated by Suciu in Ljubljana, 2004, when the latter won the title while Urzică took 8th place. Suciu is an Olympic bronze medalist with the team, a silver world medalist on pommel horse and a six-time European medalist (pommel horse, vault and team). Suciu was one of the key team members of the Romanian gymnastics team for several years contributing to the 2004 Olympic team bronze medal and three continental team medals (two gold and one silver). He also placed fourth all around at the 2004 Olympic Games.

References

External links
 
 
 
 

1977 births
Living people
Sportspeople from Sibiu
Romanian male artistic gymnasts
Gymnasts at the 2000 Summer Olympics
Gymnasts at the 2004 Summer Olympics
Olympic gymnasts of Romania
Olympic bronze medalists for Romania
Medalists at the World Artistic Gymnastics Championships
European champions in gymnastics
Olympic medalists in gymnastics
Medalists at the 2004 Summer Olympics
Universiade medalists in gymnastics
Universiade gold medalists for Romania
Universiade silver medalists for Romania
Universiade bronze medalists for Romania
Medalists at the 1997 Summer Universiade